Michael Rahjoan Lee (born June 5, 1986) is an American professional basketball player who last played for BCM U Pitești of the Romanian League. His primary position is power forward.

Early career
Lee attended Cardinal Newman High School in West Palm Beach. He played college basketball at St. Bonaventure University. In his four-year career with the Bonnies, Lee averaged 12.5 points and 6.0 rebounds per game, posting career best averages of 17.5 points and 8.0 rebounds during the 2007–08 season, his senior year.

Professional career
After going undrafted in the 2008 NBA draft, Lee signed with Cholet Basket of France. However, he played only two games for the team due to injury, and was released before the end of the year. In January 2009, Lee joined KK Split of Croatia.

In 2009, Lee signed with Albacomp of Hungary for the 2009–10 season.

In October 2010, Lee signed with Radnički Kragujevac of Serbia for the 2010–11 season. He averaged 19.6 points per game in the Adriatic League, and 14.0 points per game in the Basketball League of Serbia.

In July 2011, he signed with BC Donetsk of the Ukraine for the 2011–12 season.

He joined the Sacramento Kings for the 2012 NBA Summer League. He started three of five games, averaging 5.8 points and 2.0 rebounds for 16.4 minutes a contest. In September 2012, Lee returned to the Ukraine and signed with Politekhnika-Halychyna for the 2012–13 season.

On September 30, 2013, he signed with the Cleveland Cavaliers. However, he was later waived on October 19.

In November 2013, he was acquired by the Canton Charge. On January 27, 2014, he was traded to the Delaware 87ers.

On October 4, 2014 he signed with SOMB Boulogne-sur-Mer of the LNB Pro A. On January 8, 2015, he signed with Szolnoki Olaj of Hungary for the rest of the season.

On January 18, 2016, Lee signed with BCM U Pitești of the Romanian League.

References

External links
 St. Bonaventure bio
 Eurobasket.com profile
 FIBA.com profile

1986 births
Living people
ABA League players
African-American basketball players
Alba Fehérvár players
American expatriate basketball people in Croatia
American expatriate basketball people in France
American expatriate basketball people in Hungary
American expatriate basketball people in Romania
American expatriate basketball people in Serbia
American expatriate basketball people in Ukraine
American men's basketball players
Basketball players from Tallahassee, Florida
BC Donetsk players
BC Politekhnika-Halychyna players
Canton Charge players
Cholet Basket players
CSU Pitești players
Delaware 87ers players
KK Radnički Kragujevac (2009–2014) players
KK Split players
Power forwards (basketball)
SOMB Boulogne-sur-Mer players
St. Bonaventure Bonnies men's basketball players
Szolnoki Olaj KK players
21st-century African-American sportspeople
20th-century African-American people